Donovan Carlos Saverio Slijngard (born 28 August 1987), simply known as Donovan Slijngard, is a Dutch professional footballer who plays as a left-back for VV Noordwijk.

Club career

Ajax
Slijngard was born in Amsterdam and came through the Ajax youth ranks. In 2006, he was named AFC Ajax "Talent of the Future". He made his debut in professional football in the 2006–07 season where he played on loan for FC Groningen, while still under contract with Ajax. He made his debut for the senior squad of Ajax in the play-off game against FC Twente which finished 0–0. For the 2008–09 season, he was added to the first squad by manager Marco van Basten.

Sparta Rotterdam
After the 2008–09 season he left Ajax on a free transfer and signed a three-year contract with the club where he had already played on loan during the previous season, Sparta Rotterdam. Slijngard totally spent six seasons with the club after which he decided not to extend his expiring contract

Cambuur
On 28 August 2014, it was announced that Slijngard had joined SC Cambuur as an amateur. He will be in the running for a contract after he will be totally fit again.

Žalgiris Vilnius
On 11 July 2015, it was announced that Slijngard had joined Žalgiris Vilnius.

Personal life
Born in the Netherlands, Slijngard is of Surinamese descent.

Honours
Žalgiris
A Lyga: 2015, 2016, 2020
Lithuanian Cup: 2015–16, 2016
Lithuanian Supercup: 2016, 2017, 2020 

Individual
 AFC Ajax Talent of the Future: 2006
A Lyga Team of the Year: 2018

References

External links
 Voetbal International profile 
 Donovan Slijngard Interview

1987 births
Living people
Dutch footballers
Dutch sportspeople of Surinamese descent
Footballers from Amsterdam
Association football fullbacks
AFC Ajax players
FC Groningen players
Sparta Rotterdam players
SC Cambuur players
FK Žalgiris players
Eredivisie players
Eerste Divisie players
A Lyga players
Dutch expatriate footballers
Expatriate footballers in Lithuania
Dutch expatriate sportspeople in Lithuania